Lardgaram may refer to:
 Lardgaram-e Bala
 Lardgaram-e Pain